Erik Johansson (born 18 May 1947) is a Swedish orienteering competitor. He won a gold medal in the relay at the 1976 World Orienteering Championships in Aviemore, with the Swedish relay team, together with Gert Pettersson, Arne Johansson and Rolf Pettersson.

References

1947 births
Living people
Swedish orienteers
Male orienteers
Foot orienteers
World Orienteering Championships medalists